The British Junior English Billiards championship is an English billiards competition for players in the UK. There are three divisions, the "Girls" Championship for all female players under 19 years, the "Boys" championship for players under 16, and the "Junior" championship for players under the age of 19. The competition was thought originally to have been organised by the Billiards Association and Control Council in 1922.. However new research has found evidence that among others World Professional Billiards Champion Tom Newman won the Boys Championship before this date. Newman stated in a 1938 interview in the Billiard Player, that he won the Boys Championship in 1909 at the age of 15, winning the Championship at Burroughes and Watts, London.

Rex Williams, Mark Wildman, Mike Russell, Peter Gilchrist, David Causier, and Chris Shutt all won Junior titles before going to win the World Billiards Championship. World Snooker Championship winners to have recorded wins in the Junior Billiards event are Walter Donaldson, Dennis Taylor and Steve Davis. Fred Davis, champion in 1928, went on to win world professional titles in both billiards and snooker.

In 2022, William Thompson of Southampton, Hampshire(9 years old) became the youngest-ever winner of the Under-16 event.

Robin Wilson (Middlesbrough) holds the record for the most wins in the Championship, with 2 wins in the Boys and 5 in the Junior.

The highest Championship breaks recorded in each event are, Hannah Jones (Derby), 43 in the 2011 Girls, Donald Cruikshank (South Shields), 130 in the 1936 Boys and Glen Cromack (Middlesbrough), 150 in the 1989 Junior.

Under-16 Champions

Source: English Amateur Billiards Association, unless stated otherwise.

Under-19 Champions

Source: English Amateur Billiards Association, unless stated otherwise.

Girls
The Girls' championship was first held in 1933. The age limit was 16 for the 1933 event, but was raised to 18 the following year. The competition was revived in 1950 after a break of more than ten years, this time with an age limit of 17.

Notes

References 

Cue sports